Quime Municipality is the second municipal section of the Inquisivi Province in the La Paz Department in Bolivia, located south-east of the city of La Paz. Its seat is Quime. The coordinates are  16° 59' 0" South, 67° 13' 0".

Geography 
There are three rivers nearby, the Quime River, Chanvillalla River, and Chichipata River.

The Kimsa Cruz mountain range traverses the municipality. Some of the highest mountains of the municipality are listed below:

 Ch'amak Qullu
 Iskayuni
 Jach'a Pukara
 Janq'u Quta
 Kimsa Willk'i
 León Jiwata
 Qina Qina
 Turini

Division 
The municipality consists of the following cantons:
 Choquetanga Canton - 2,537 inhabitants (2001) 
 Figueroa Canton - 149 inhabitants 
 Waña Quta Canton - 69 inhabitants
 Quime Canton - 4,583 inhabitants

See also 
 Laram Quta
 Wallatani Lake
 Watir Quta

References 

Municipalities of La Paz Department (Bolivia)